Jutta Balster (born 4 May 1952) is a German former volleyball player. She competed in the women's tournament at the 1976 Summer Olympics.

References

External links
 

1952 births
Living people
German women's volleyball players
Olympic volleyball players of East Germany
Volleyball players at the 1976 Summer Olympics
People from Plau am See
Sportspeople from Mecklenburg-Western Pomerania